Hadžiabdić is a surname. Notable people with the surname include:

Džemal Hadžiabdić (born 1953), Bosnia and Herzegovina footballer and manager
Enver Hadžiabdić (born 1945), Bosnia and Herzegovina footballer and manager
Mili Hadžiabdić (born 1963), Bosnia and Herzegovina footballer

Bosnian surnames